Gail Minault (born 25 March 1939) is an American historian of South Asia.

Life
Gail Minault was born in Minneapolis, Minnesota on 25 March 1939. She was educated in the public schools of Pottstown, Pennsylvania before completing high school at the Northfield School for Girls in Northfield, Massachusetts. While attending Smith College, Minault spent her junior year abroad attending the École Libre des Sciences Politiques in Paris, France, and graduated in 1961. Minault then worked three years for the United States Foreign Service in Washington, D.C., Beirut, Lebanon, and East Pakistan (now Bangladesh) before resigning to study South Asian history at the University of Pennsylvania. She was awarded her M.A. degree in South Asian regional studies in 1966 and her Ph.D. six years later. Minault has been married twice. Minault's first marriage, to Thomas Graham, Jr., ended in divorce after the death of their son. She remarried Leon W. Ellsworth. Minault has one adopted daughter from her first marriage and a stepson from her second. Minault began teaching at the University of Texas and has written or co-editor of five books and thirty-five scholarly articles.

Notes

References

1939 births
University of Pennsylvania alumni
Smith College alumni
21st-century American historians
Living people
Northfield Mount Hermon School alumni
Historians from Minnesota
Historians from Pennsylvania